"The Outcasts of Poker Flat" (1869) is a short story written by writer of the American West Bret Harte. An example of naturalism and local color of California during the first half of the nineteenth century. The story was first published in January 1869 in the magazine Overland Monthly. It was one of two short stories which brought the author national attention.

Plot summary
The story takes place in a Californian community known as Poker Flat, near the town of La Porte. Following the loss of several thousand dollars and two horses, and the death of a notable resident, the town has formed a secret committee to rid itself of any "improper" people, hanging two and banishing others. On November 23, 1850, four such individuals are exiled from Poker Flat and warned not to return on pain of death. The first of them is a professional poker player, John Oakhurst, who has won large amounts from those on the secret committee. On his way out of town, he is joined by two women, the Duchess and Mother Shipton, and Uncle Billy, the town drunk and a suspected robber. These four set out for the Sandy Bar mining camp, a day's journey away over a mountain range. At noon, over Oakhurst's protests, the group stops for a rest.

While on their rest, the group is met by a pair of runaway lovers on their way to Poker Flat to get married, Tom Simson (known also as "The Innocent") and 15-year-old Piney Woods. Simson has met Oakhurst before and has great admiration for him, as Oakhurst won a great deal of money from Simson. Oakhurst had returned the money and urged Simson to quit gambling, as he was a terrible player. Nonetheless, Simson is thrilled to have come upon Oakhurst on this day and decides that he and Piney will stay with the group for a while. They are unaware of the group's status as exiles, and Simson assumes that the Duchess is Oakhurst's wife, to the amusement of Uncle Billy.

A decision is made for everyone to stay the night together, and the group takes shelter in a half-built cabin Simson has discovered. In the middle of the night, Oakhurst wakes up and sees a heavy snowstorm raging. Looking about, he realizes that Uncle Billy has fled with the group's horses and mules. They are all now forced to wait out the storm with provisions that will likely only last for another 10 days. After a week in the cabin, Mother Shipton dies, having secretly and altruistically starved herself in order to give her rations to Piney. Oakhurst fashions some snowshoes for Simson to use in traveling to Poker Flat for help, telling the others he will accompany the young man part of the way. The "law of Poker Flat" finally arrives at the cabin, only to find the Duchess and Piney frozen to death and embracing in a peaceful repose. They look so peaceful and innocent that the onlookers cannot tell which of them had been exiled for her immoral behavior.

Oakhurst commits suicide under a tree by shooting himself through the heart with his derringer. A playing card, the two of clubs, is found pinned to the trunk with a note written on it:
BENEATH THIS TREE
LIES THE BODY   
OF   
JOHN OAKHURST,   
WHO STRUCK A STREAK OF BAD LUCK   
ON THE 23rd OF NOVEMBER, 1850,   
AND   
HANDED IN HIS CHECKS  
ON THE 7TH DECEMBER, 1850.

Characters
 John Oakhurst
One of the story's heroes, Oakhurst is occasionally frank but kind in motivation. He is chivalrous, insisting upon switching his good riding horse Five Spot for the mule of the Duchess and refusing to use vulgar language. He further shows his good nature by returning the $40 he had won from Tom Simson in a card game and saying, "Tommy, you're a good little man, but you can't gamble worth a cent. Don't try it over again." Oakhurst is not a drinker. He is cool tempered, even keeled and has a calm manner about him. He believes in luck and fate. His suicide spurs the question whether he was simply giving in to his bad luck or rather, decided he was no longer going to live by luck and took his life.
 The Duchess, a young woman.
 Mother Shipton, another woman.
 Uncle Billy, a "suspected sluice-robber and confirmed drunkard".
 Tom Simson, a naïve young man who has run away from the Sandy Bar mining camp with Piney Woods and intends to marry her at Poker Flat.
 Piney Woods, a "a stout, comely damsel of fifteen" who is engaged to Simson.

Film, TV or theatrical adaptations
Harte's story has been brought to film at least five times, including in 1919 with Harry Carey, in 1937 with Preston Foster, and in 1952 with Dale Robertson. The Spaghetti Western Four of the Apocalypse is based on this story and another of Harte's stories, "The Luck of Roaring Camp".

Operas based on The Outcasts of Poker Flats include those by Samuel Adler, Jaromir Weinberger, Stanworth Beckler, and Andrew Earle Simpson.

References

External links

The Outcasts of Poker Flat – Annotated text + analyses aligned to Common Core Standards
 The Outcasts of Poker Flat by Bret Harte

1869 short stories
Western (genre) short stories
Short stories by Bret Harte
Short stories set in California
Works originally published in Overland Monthly